Barrelhouse Records was an American blues and rockabilly record label, set up in 1969 by George Paulus.

Its roster included musicians as varied as Washboard Willie, Big John Wrencher, Charlie Feathers, Harmonica Frank, Sleepy John Estes, Johnny "Man" Young, Blind Joe Hill, Joe Carter, Robert Richard, Marcus Van Story, Easy Baby and his Houserockers, and the Chicago Slim Blues Band.

See also
 List of record labels

External links
Illustrated Barrelhouse Records discography

Blues record labels
Defunct record labels of the United States